Lucile Connaghan was an American politician from Riverton, Wyoming who served in the Wyoming House of Representatives, representing Fremont County from 1933 to 1937 as a Democrat in the 22nd and 23rd Wyoming Legislatures.

Notes

References

External links
Official page at the Wyoming Legislature

Year of birth missing
Year of death missing
20th-century American women politicians
Democratic Party members of the Wyoming House of Representatives
Women state legislators in Wyoming
People from Riverton, Wyoming